Der letzte Tag may refer to:

"Der letzte Tag", 1956 radio play by Günter Eich with Ilse Aichinger
Der letzte Tag, silent film directed by Max Mack
"Der letzte Tag", 2006 song by Tokio Hotel
"Der letzte Tag", 2004 single by Elis from the album Dark Clouds in a Perfect Sky